Stadio Comunale di Monigo is a sports stadium in the Treviso frazione of Monigo, Italy. The stadium is used for rugby union, and is the home ground for Benetton. 

The Tribuna Ovest was the only originally covered stand, in fact the East Stand was renovated in 2018, increasing the capacity and building a cover.

On the occasion of the test match between Italy and Scotland which was played there on 24 January 1998, the capacity was expanded to approximately  seats thanks to the installation of some temporary stands at the sides of the permanent ones.

The stadium contains six changing rooms for athletes and referees, multiple food&drink outlets, a restaurant, the historical club house, an events room, a press room, a photographers' room, a hospitality suite and the club shop. There are ample parking spaces for a thousand cars adjacent to the stadium and a bus stop is located nearby. 

On 19 June 2021, Stadio Comunale di Monigo hosted the Pro14 Rainbow Cup final, where the home side Benetton Rugby faced the winners of the South-African conference, the Bulls. Only  supporters were allowed in the stadium because of COVID-19 pandemic restrictions.

References

External links
 Stadio Comunale di Monigo

Monigo
Monigo
Monigo
Sports venues in Veneto